Sabsovich, Sapsovich may refer to:
 Leonid Sabsovich, a Jewish Soviet urban planner and economist
 , American female rabbi
 Hirsch Loeb Sabsovich (1860-1921), Jewish American agronomist, chemist, mayor of Woodbine, New Jersey

Jewish surnames
Slavic-language surnames